These are the New Territories East results of the 2008 Hong Kong legislative election. The election was held on 7 September 2008 and all 7 seats in New Territories East where consisted of North District, Tai Po District, Sai Kung District and Sha Tin District were contested. The pro-democracy camp succeeded in holding five seats out of seven seats, with James Tien lost his seat to Wong Sing-chi of the Democratic Party.

Overall results
Before election:

Change in composition:

Candidates list

See also
Legislative Council of Hong Kong
Hong Kong legislative elections
2008 Hong Kong legislative election

External links 
 Legislative Council Elections

References

2008 Hong Kong legislative election